Robert George Andrus (March 26, 1925 – November 9, 2015) was an American football coach.  He was the head football coach at the Wesley College in Dover, Delaware from 1967 to 1986.

Andrus played a significant role in transitioning Wesley from a Junior College team to a 4–year NCAA Division III program. A native of Duquesne, Pennsylvania, he played on the 1947 Maryland Terrapins football team that competed in the 1948 Gator Bowl.

Head coaching record

College

References

1925 births
2015 deaths
Maryland Terrapins football players
Wesley Wolverines football coaches
People from Duquesne, Pennsylvania